The County of Kara Kara is one of the 37 counties of Victoria which are part of the cadastral divisions of Australia, used for land titles. The northern boundary of the county is at 36°S. At the north its western boundary is 143°E. Larger towns include St Arnaud and Donald. The County was proclaimed in 1871 together with the other counties of the Wimmera Land District.

Parishes 
Parishes within the county:
Amphitheatre (part in the County of Gladstone)
Avoca (part in the County of Gladstone)
Banyena
Banyenong
Barkly
Bolangum
Bolerch
Boola Boloke
Bunguluke
Burrum Burrum (part in the County of Borung)
Callawadda (part in the County of Borung)
Carapooee
Carapooee West
Carapugna (part in the County of Tatchera)
Charlton West
Coonooer West
Corack East
Crowlands (part in the County of Borung)
Dalyenong
Darkbonee
Donald
Doboobetic
Eversley
Glendhu
Glenlogie (part in the County of Gladstone)
Glenpatrick
Glynwylln (part in the County of Borung)
Gowar (part in the County of Gladstone)
Gre Gre
Jeffcott
Joel Joel (part in the County of Borung)
Kooreh (part in the County of Gladstone)
Kooroc (part in the County of Gladstone)
Landsborough
Malakoff
Marnoo
Moolerr
Moorl Moorl
Mount Cole (parts in the County of Borung and County of Ripon)
Moyreisk
Navarre
Redbank
Rich Avon East (part in the County of Borung)
St Arnaud
Swanwater
Tchirree
Teddywaddy
Thalia
Tottington
Wallaloo
Warngar
Warrak
Warrenmang
Winjallok
Wirchilleba (part in the County of Borung)
Wooronok
Wycheproof
Yehrip

References

Research aids, Victoria 1910
Map of the counties of Lowan, Borung and Kara Kara showing colony and parish boundaries, main roads, telegraph lines and railways.  1886. National Library of Australia

Counties of Victoria (Australia)